Diospyros ferruginescens is a tree in the family Ebenaceae. Twigs dry to black. Inflorescences bear up to nine flowers. The specific epithet  is from the Latin meaning "becoming rusty", referring to the indumentum. Habitat is forests from sea level to  altitude. D. ferruginescens is endemic to Borneo.

References

ferruginescens
Plants described in 1941
Endemic flora of Borneo
Trees of Borneo